Brajagopal Roy (1935/1936 – 31 July 2022) was an Indian politician. Roy was the main leader of the All India Forward Bloc in the North-Eastern state of Tripura. He was President of the AIFB Tripura State Committee and a member of the All India Secretariat of the party.

Roy was member of the legislative assembly of Tripura 1978–1983 and 1993–1998, representing the Town Bordowali constituency. In the 1998 election he lost his seat, coming second with 7665 votes (36.92%).

Roy stood as the Left Front candidate in Town Bardowali in the 2003 state legislative assembly elections. Among others, he had to face dissident Forward Bloc candidate Nitish Das. Roy came second with 9844 votes (43,57%). Das came third with 331 votes (1,46%).

References

1930s births
2022 deaths
All India Forward Bloc politicians
Tripura politicians
Year of birth missing
Tripura MLAs 1977–1983
Tripura MLAs 1993–1998